Julitta Münch (25 July 1959 – 21 May 2020) was a German presenter and journalist.

Life 

Münch was born in Düsseldorf, and did a journalistic traineeship after completing her studies in 1989. From 1995, she worked at WDR 5, where she presented Morgenecho and Neugier genügt. From 1997 to the end of 2010, Münch took over the radio broadcast program Hallo Ü-Wagen at WDR 5.

In addition, she was a reporter for ARD and presented at Deutschlandfunk  Wirtschaftsmagazin and Morgenmagazin.

Münch died on 21 May 2020 in Lohmar, aged 60.

References

1959 births
2020 deaths
Westdeutscher Rundfunk people
ARD (broadcaster) people
German journalists
German women journalists
German women television presenters
German radio presenters
German women radio presenters
German television presenters